Quettehou is a commune in the Manche department in north-western France. On 1 January 2019, the former commune Morsalines was merged into Quettehou.

Geography
The town of Quettehou is located at the North-East tip of the peninsula of Cotentin in an area called Val de Saire, the vale of the river Saire.

History
The creation of Quettehou dates back to the Viking invasions when Ketil, chief of a Viking tribe, decided to settle at the top of the hill dominating the bay of Morsalines. With time, Ketil's hill (Ketil holm) became known as Quettehou.

The Black Prince was knighted in the local church by his father, King Edward III of England, on 12 July 1346, prior to the Battle of Crécy.

See also
 Communes of the Manche department

References

External links

 Local site about Quettehou and its surroundings (in French & English)

Communes of Manche
Populated places established in 2019
Populated coastal places in France